Arena Rap is the first extended play by American rapper Yelawolf. It was released on December 28, 2008 under record label Ghet-O-Vision Entertainment and management group Redd Klay Entertainment.

Track listing

Sample credits
"Come on Over" samples "Down the Line" by José González. 
"Gone" interpolates "The Breakup Song (They Don't Write 'Em)" by The Greg Kihn Band.

Personnel
 Yelawolf – vocals
 Ashanti Floyd – fiddle, violin
 Gabriel Artime – turntables, drums
 Malay – guitars, keyboards, programming, executive producer
 Kawan Prather - executive producer 
 Jeremy Jones - associate producer
 Courtney Sills - associate producer
 José González - producer, vocals, composer
 Jim Jonsin - producer
 DJ Ideal - producer
 Greg Kihn - composer
 The Hydrilla - designer, artwork

References

2008 debut EPs
Yelawolf albums